Peter Michalica (born July 10, 1945, Kremnica) is a Slovak violinist. He placed third in the 1966 Carl Flesch International Violin Competition.

References

External links
 Biography at osobnosti.sk 
 Michalica's profile at hc.sk in English and Slovak
 Michalica's entry in the StB database 
 Pribina Cross (2nd class) 
 Biography (at 65 years of age)  

1945 births
Living people
People from Kremnica
Slovak musicians
Slovak violinists
21st-century violinists